"Das weisse Licht", alternatively spelled Das weiße Licht (German for "The white light"), is a song by German rock band Oomph! and the first single from their 1999 album Plastik.

Music video
The music video is set in a small experimental town where almost every human has been replaced with a cyborg. Almost, because Dero Goi has not been replaced yet. Dero realizes the truth due to an accident a woman had, and tries to escape. At the end, it turns out that Dero has already been copied, and it's a machine which wanted to escape and prevent being converted.

Track listing

Standard edition
 Das weisse Licht (Single Version)
 Das weisse Licht (Fütter mich Remix by Schallbau)
 Das weisse Licht (Cleener Remix by Daniel Myer)
 Das weisse Licht (Camouflage Remix by Heiko Maile)
 Das weisse Licht (Headcrashed Remix by Herwig Meyszner)

Limited edition
 Das weisse Licht (Single Version)
 Das weisse Licht (Fütter mich Remix by Schallbau)
 Das weisse Licht (Cleener Remix by Daniel Myer)
 Das weisse Licht (Camouflage Remix by Heiko Maile)
 Das weisse Licht (Headcrashed Remix by Herwig Meyszner)
 Das weisse Licht (Haujobb Remix by Daniel Myer)
 Das weisse Licht (Submarine Remix by Econic)

References

1999 songs
Oomph! songs
Songs written by Dero Goi